"Cheatin' on Me" was released as one of two singles from American R&B singer Kandi Burruss' debut album Hey Kandi. The song saw minor to moderate success only with peak positions of number 72 on the Hot R&B/Hip-Hop Songs chart. The music video was released and received primarily limited airplay on BET.

Track listing

Charts

References

2000 songs
2001 singles
Kandi Burruss songs
Columbia Records singles
Songs written by Kandi Burruss
Songs written by Kevin "She'kspere" Briggs
Songs about infidelity